Bhashacharya Acharya Suniti Kumar Chatterjee (26 November 1890 – 29 May 1977) was an Indian linguist, educationist and litterateur. He was a recipient of the second-highest Indian civilian honour of Padma Vibhushan.

Life

Childhood
Chatterji was born on 26 November 1890 at Shibpur in Howrah. He was the son of Haridas Chattopadhyay, an affluent Rarhi Kulin Brahmin. According to the family history, their ancestors were originally residents of a village named chatuti in the Rarh region of present-day West Bengal. During the Turkic invasion of Bengal in the thirteenth century, the Chatterji family left their ancestral village in West Bengal and took shelter in East Bengal. Later Professor Chatterji's great grandfather Sri Bhairab Chatterji, migrated to a village in the district of Hooghly from his ancestral village home in the district of Faridpur in East
Bengal, now in Bangladesh. Bhairab Chatterji, like many other Kulin Brahmins of the day, subsisted mainly on polygamy. Bhairab had a few wives, but he lived with the one who had belonged to the village in Hooghly. Bhairab's son Isvarchandra, the grandfather of Chatterji, had served the East India Company in North India during the Mutiny. After retirement, he built a modest one storied house for himself in Calcutta and shifted there the residence of the family from the Hooghly village. Isvar's son Haridas Chatterji was the father of Suniti Kumar. .

Education
Suniti Kumar was a meritorious student, and passed the Entrance (school leaving) examination from the Mutty Lal Seal's Free School (1907), ranking sixth, and the FA (pre-university examination) from the renowned Scottish Church College, standing third. He did his Major (Honours) in English literature from Presidency College, Kolkata, standing first in the first class in 1911. His childhood friend was the famous industrialist Nagendra Nath Das founder of Power Tools And Appliance Co. Ltd. In 1913, he completed his M.A. in English literature, again standing first. The same year, he was appointed lecturer in English at Vidyasagar College, Kolkata where his colleague was the thespian, Sisir Kumar Bhaduri.

Profession
In 1914, he became assistant professor of English in the Post-Graduate Department of the University of Calcutta, which he held till 1919. He went abroad to study at the University of London where he studied Phonology, Indo-European Linguistics, Prakrit, Persian, Old Irish, Gothic and other languages. He then went to Paris and did research at the Sorbonne in Indo-Aryan, Slav and Indo-European Linguistics, Greek and Latin. His teacher was the internationally acclaimed linguist, Jules Bloch. After returning to India in 1922, he joined the University of Calcutta as the Khaira Professor of Indian Linguistics and Phonetics. After retirement in 1952, he was made Professor Emeritus and later in 1965, the National Research Professor of India for Humanities.

Foreign travel with Tagore
Suniti Kumar accompanied Rabindranath Tagore to Malaya, Siam, Sumatra, Java, and Bali, where he delivered lectures on Indian art and culture.  He was Chairman of the West Bengal Legislative Council (1952–58) and President (1969) of the Sahitya Akademi.

Bibliography
 
 
 
 
 
 
 
 
 
 
 
 
 
 
 
 
 
 
 
 
 
 
 
 
 
 
 
 
 
 

Bibliographies of Suniti Kumar Chatterji's work have also been published:

Notable students
Sukumar Sen
Korada Mahadeva Sastri

Death
Suniti Kumar died on May 29, 1977 in Calcutta. A large part of his house 'Sudharma' সুধর্মা, an architectural marvel, in South Calcutta has been converted into a Fabindia store.

References

External links

Balticists
1890 births
1977 deaths
20th-century Indian educators
Alumni of the University of London
20th-century Bengalis
Emeritus Professors in India
Linguists from Bengal
People from Howrah
Presidents of The Asiatic Society
Recipients of the Padma Vibhushan in literature & education
Recipients of the Padma Bhushan in literature & education
Scholars from West Bengal
Scientists from West Bengal
Scottish Church College alumni
University of Paris alumni
University of Calcutta alumni
Academic staff of the University of Calcutta
Linguists of Bengali
Linguists of Indo-Aryan languages
Indian expatriates in France
Scholars from Kolkata